Robert Markland  was an English politician who sat in the House of Commons  in 1659.

Markland was of a Wigan family which was long resident in borough and possessed of considerable local influence. He was a manufacturer or mercer. 

In 1659, Markland was elected Member of Parliament for Wigan in the Third Protectorate Parliament.

References

Year of birth missing
Year of death missing
English MPs 1659
17th-century English people